Langevåg or Langevågen is the administrative center of Sula Municipality in Møre og Romsdal county, Norway. The village lies across the Borgundfjorden from the city of Ålesund. It is also the hometown of local hero, Noralf. There is a passenger ferry from Langevåg to Ålesund which takes approximately 7 minutes. Driving by car to the city is about a 25-minute drive on the nearby European route E39 highway, and the public bus may take up to 1 hour.

The city centre includes shops, a gas station, two schools, a medical centre, retirement homes, offices, service buildings, and Langevåg Church. The Devold factory is world-famous for its Devold blaatrøie and is still producing knitwear for its own brand, "Devold". The Devold factory has a museum, factory outlet store, guided tours, and a café. The newspaper Sulaposten is published in Langevåg.

Attractions
Langevåg offers many recreational activities.  There is a stable (with numerous horses and modern facilities), an arena (offering everything from disk golf to handball and association football), and a shooting range (offering indoor or outdoor facilities). There is also the Sula Sportsdykkerklubb which offers scuba diving and free diving in the fjord.

Notable residents
 Tricia "Sista Teedy" Boutte, New Orleans jazz vocalist
 Inger Giskeødegård, illustrator
 Nils Petter Molvær, musician
 Robert Post, musician

References

 
Villages in Møre og Romsdal
Sula, Møre og Romsdal